Joshua (Josh) Saunders (born 31 August 1994) is a former professional Australian rules footballer who played for the St Kilda Football Club in the Australian Football League (AFL). He was initially picked with the 43rd selection in the 2012 national draft.

AFL career
Saunders attended The Geelong College, and in year 9 was one of the youngest-ever Geelong College students to play in the 1st XVIII Football team, at only 14 years old. He later played for Geelong Falcons, where in 2012 he received the coach's award. He is noted for his run-and-carry style of play, explosive pace, and endurance.

In Round 5 of the 2013 AFL season, Saunders made his AFL debut for St Kilda against Sydney Swans at Westpac Stadium in Wellington, New Zealand, in the first-ever premiership season game held outside Australia.

He was delisted in October 2015; however, he was re-drafted in the 2016 rookie draft. He was delisted again at the end of the 2016 season.

References

External links

St Kilda Football Club players
Geelong Falcons players
1994 births
Living people
Australian rules footballers from Victoria (Australia)
People educated at Geelong College
Sandringham Football Club players